2 Cool 2 Be 4gotten is a 2016 Filipino coming-of-age drama film directed by Petersen Vargas in his feature-length directorial debut and written by Jason Paul Laxamana. The film stars Khalil Ramos, Ethan Salvador and Jameson Blake. It depicts the mysterious coming-of-age tale of Felix after he met half-American Snyder brothers, Magnus and Maxim.

The film premiered on November 17, 2016 at the 2016 Cinema One Originals Film Festival, where it won three awards, including Best Picture. It was commercially released by Star Cinema on March 15, 2017 in selected theaters nationwide.

Synopsis
The film depicts the coming-of-age story of Felix (Khalil Ramos), a friendless and smart high school sophomore, who lives in post-lahar Pampanga in the late 1990s. His life takes a turn after the two new half-American students, the Snyder brothers, Magnus (Ethan Salvador) and Maxim (Jameson Blake), transfer to his school. He finds himself drawn toward them, especially Magnus, who becomes his classmate. Magnus befriends him and he infiltrates the private lives of the Snyder brothers. He interweaves himself to the dark and mysterious motives of the Snyder brothers and at the same time, his interactions with them uncover desires within him that he has never confronted before.

Cast

Main
 Khalil Ramos as Felix Salonga
 Ethan Salvador as Magnus Snyder 
 Jameson Blake as Maximilian "Maxim" Snyder

Supporting
 Ana Capri as Demetria
 Peewee O'Hara as Mrs. Salvacion
 Meann Espinosa as Ms. Echiverri
 Joel Saracho as Mr. Pangan
 Ruby Ruiz as Felix's mom
 Badjun Lacap as Felix's dad
 Jomari Angeles as Spencer
 Jerom Canlas as Leon
 Dylan Talon as Arwin

Production
Director Petersen Vargas started his career in filmmaking by producing short films and shooting music videos. He became prominent after he won the Best Direction award for his short film, in the 2015 Cinemalaya Film Festival. In early 2016, Vargas approached fellow Kapampangan filmmaker Jason Paul Laxamana to collaborate for an entirely different story concept he had in mind. But instead, Laxamana offered him to direct a script he has written which was originally entitled Dos Mestizos. Laxamana's script focused on the effect of the arrival of the half-American Snyder brothers in their new school and Vargas made some revisions to this script to focus on their relationship with Felix. Later on, Vargas and the film's creative consultant, Jade Castro, decided to change its title from Dos Mestizos to 2 Cool 2 Be 4gotten to reflect the youthful spirit of the film. The title was inspired by Lucinda Williams' 1998 song, "2 Kool 2 Be 4-gotten".

They finished filming the film in just 8 days in order for it to be completed in time for the 2016 Cinema One Originals Film Festival.

Release
The film originally received a R-13 rating during its screenings at the 2016 Cinema One Originals Film Festival. When it was submitted for a review for its nationwide commercial release, the Movie and Television Review and Classification Board (MTRCB) gave it a R-16 rating. The producers appealed the rating but instead, the MTRCB slammed the film with a R-18 rating as it said that “the film lacks any social redeeming value.” This caused an outrage from some netizens and filmmakers.

Critical reception

Maridol Ranoa-Bismark of Philippine Entertainment Portal writes, "2 Cool has the potential to affect viewers with its versions of unconditional love." Philbert Dy of The Neighborhood gave it 4.5 out of 5 stars, commending the cinematography and the acting of the ensemble cast. Oggs Cruz of Rappler praised Laxamana's screenplay by describing it "as intelligent as it is emotionally potent." Cruz further described the film as "a work of gorgeous sentimentality."

Rito Asilo of the Philippine Daily Inquirer highlighted the performances of Ramos and Salvador by saying that the film "gets its main thespic tag-team boost from Salvador and Ramos’ complementary portrayals, each in thoughtful sync with the other." Status Magazine stated that it would "keep the audience on their toes with gripping scenes and a conflicted narrative." Prominent writer J. Neil Garcia described the film as "textured and outstanding". Furthermore, he praised the "deft and beautiful direction" of Vargas and the "comparably strong and noteworthy" performances of Ramos, Salvador and Blake. Movies for Millennials calls it "...sweet, humorous, romantic... An experience that's too cool to be forgotten. No pun intended."

Awards and nominations

References

External links
 
 

2016 films
2010s coming-of-age films
2016 LGBT-related films
Philippine coming-of-age films
Philippine LGBT-related films
2010s English-language films
Filipino-language films
Films set in the 1990s
2016 directorial debut films